Leeds Lions are a defunct British motorcycle speedway team who were based at Fullerton Park Sports Stadium, adjacent to the Elland Road football ground in Leeds, England.

History
Leeds Lions operated between 1928 and 1938. League racing first took place in 1929 with the formation of the English Dirt Track League, effectively a Northern League, which ran alongside the Southern League. Leeds were champions of the English Dirt Track League in 1929, the title being awarded to them when White City (Manchester) failed to end the season 

The club competed in the 1931 Speedway Northern League finishing second. Their final appearance was in 1938 Speedway National League Division Two where they finished 9th.

Season summary

Notable riders

References

Defunct British speedway teams
Sport in Leeds